Gary Lee Boyd (born August 22, 1946) is an American former professional baseball player. A right-handed pitcher, he appeared in eight games in Major League Baseball for the 1969 Cleveland Indians.

Baseball career
A native of Pasadena, California, Boyd played baseball at Juniperro Serra High School in Gardena, graduating in 1964.
Cleveland selected Boyd in the fourth round of the 1965 Major League Baseball draft, the first such amateur lottery ever conducted. During his fourth season in the Indians' farm system he was recalled from the Triple-A Portland Beavers in midsummer and made his MLB debut as a starting pitcher against the Kansas City Royals on August 1. Plagued by wildness, he issued four bases on balls and threw a wild pitch in 1 innings pitched and was relieved in the second frame with the Indians trailing, 2–0. Boyd was tagged with the Tribe's eventual 6–0 loss.

He worked in seven more games for Cleveland that season, and was awarded two more starts. But he failed to last more than 2 innings in each, and concluded his MLB pitching career  on September 26 by throwing an inning of scoreless relief against the Washington Senators. During his major league tenure, Boyd compiled an 0–2 won–lost record and an earned run average of 9.00.  In 11 total innings pitched, he allowed only eight hits but 14 bases on balls. He struck out nine.

Boyd pitched in the high minors through 1972 before retiring after eight professional seasons.

References

External links

1946 births
Living people
Baseball players from Pasadena, California
Cleveland Indians players
Major League Baseball pitchers
Pawtucket Indians players
Portland Beavers players
Salinas Indians players
Savannah Indians players
Tucson Toros players
Wichita Aeros players
Junípero Serra High School (Gardena, California) alumni